This is a list of collectible miniature games.
 Axis & Allies Miniatures
 Capes & Cowls: Adventures in Wyrd City
 Creepy Freaks
 Crimson Skies
 Doctor Who Microverse
 Dreamblade
 Dungeons & Dragons Miniatures
 Fistful of Aliens
 Gamoja
 HeroClix
 Heroscape
 Horrorclix
 Mage Knight
 Marvel Attacktix
 Battle dice
 Marvel Superhero Showdown
 MechWarrior
 Monsterpocalypse
 Mutant Chronicles CMG 
 NASCAR Race Day
 MLB Sportclix
 Pirates Constructible Strategy Game (Pirates of the Spanish Main)
 Pokémon Trading Figure Game
 Racer Knights of Falconus
 Rocketmen
 Shadowrun Duels
 Star Wars Attacktix
 Star Wars Epic Duels
 Star Wars Miniatures
 Transformers Attacktix
 WarChest
 Warheads: Medieval Tales''
 WebCardz Ben 10 Alien Force
 World of Warcraft Miniatures
 U.B. Funkeys
 Yu-Gi-Oh! Capsule Monsters Collectible Figure Game

Collectible miniatures games